Kommer du, Elsa? (Are You Coming, Elsa?) is a Norwegian drama film from 1944 directed by Toralf Sandø. The script was written by Sandø and Victor Borg, and it is based on Borg's play Kommer du, Elsa? The cast includes Aase Bye, Erling Drangsholt, and Harald Schwenzen.

Plot
Leif Rieber is a famous conductor. He has a promising young son who plays the violin, and his father features him as a soloist in one of his major concerts. The son has tuberculosis and dies during the concert. The father blames himself for the son's death and takes to drinking. Later he is affected by marital problems and illness.

Cast
Aase Bye as Elsa Rieber, Leif Rieber's wife
Erling Drangsholt as Leif Rieber, a musician
Harald Schwenzen as Øistein Werner, Rieber's friend
Bjarne Larsen as Harald Rieber, Elsa and Leif Rieber's son
Liv Blom as Kari, Harald's friend
Oscar Egede-Nissen as a vagabond
Tore Foss as Smith, a doctor and patient
Gunvor Hall as Mrs. Kramer, a patient at the sanatorium
Erling Hanson as Bjerke, a doctor at the sanatorium
Alfred Helgeby as Jørgensen, a caretaker at the sanatorium
Birger Lødner as Borgen, a doctor
Gunnar Olram as the professor, a patient at the sanatorium
Erna Schøyen as Kristine, a maid at the Rieber home
Liv Uchermann Selmer as Miss Enger
Einar Vaage as the senior physician
Aage Wallin as the concertmaster and violinist at Aulaen Hall

References

External links
 
 Kommer du, Elsa? at the National Library of Norway

1944 films
Norwegian drama films
Norwegian black-and-white films
1940s Norwegian-language films
Films directed by Toralf Sandø